Hairy/enhancer-of-split related with YRPW motif-like protein is a protein that in humans is encoded by the HEYL gene.

This gene encodes a member of the hairy and enhancer of split-related (HESR) family of basic helix-loop-helix (bHLH)-type transcription factors. The sequence of the encoded protein contains a conserved bHLH and orange domain, but its YRPW motif has diverged from other HESR family members. It is thought to be an effector of Notch signaling and a regulator of cell fate decisions. Alternatively spliced transcript variants have been found, but their biological validity has not been determined.

References

Further reading

External links 
 

Transcription factors